Elyse Knox (born Elsie M. Kornbrath, December 14, 1917 – February 16, 2012) was an American actress, model, and fashion designer.

Early life
Knox was born in Hartford, Connecticut, the daughter of Austrian immigrants Hermine Sophie (née Muck) and Frederick Kornbrath. She had a brother, Fred.

She attended Hartford Public High School, graduating in 1936, and studied at the Traphagen School of Fashion in Manhattan, New York.

Career
Knox performed mainly in minor or secondary roles until 1942, when she had a leading role with Lon Chaney Jr. in The Mummy's Tomb, one of the series of Mummy horror films made by Universal Studios. She appeared as herself in the Universal Studios 1944 production Follow the Boys, one of the World War II morale-booster films made both for the soldiers serving overseas and civilians at home. Knox also was a pin-up girl during the war, appearing in such magazines as Yank, a weekly published and distributed by the United States military.

In late 1945, Knox was signed by Monogram Pictures to portray Anne Howe, the love interest of fictional boxer Joe Palooka in Joe Palooka, Champ. Based on the very popular comic strip, the instant success of the May 1946 film led to Knox appearing in another five Joe Palooka productions. After acting in 39 films, Knox retired in 1949 following her performance in the musical film There's a Girl in My Heart.

Personal life
While appearing on the Bing Crosby radio show, she met football star Tom Harmon, winner of the Heisman Trophy in 1940. They were engaged to be married, but ended the relationship when Harmon entered the U.S. Army Air Forces in 1942. On February 21, 1942, Knox married commercial photographer Paul Hesse in Coronado, California.

Following her divorce and Harmon's return from World War II (during which he survived two plane crashes and being lost in the jungle), she and Harmon married in 1944. Her wedding dress was made of silk from the parachute Harmon used when bailing out of his plane. After Harmon's demobilization, they settled in the Los Angeles area.

Children
The couple had three children: Kristin, Kelly, and Mark. Kristin became an actress and painter, who at 17 married recording artist Ricky Nelson and gave birth to four children: Tracy, twins Gunnar and Matthew, and Sam. Kelly, a model turned interior designer, was once married to automaker John DeLorean, and has two daughters and a son and two other stepchildren. Mark played quarterback at UCLA, became an actor, and has two sons with wife Pam Dawber.

Death
On February 16, 2012, Knox died at her home in Los Angeles at age 94.

Filmography

References

External links

Obituary, The Daily Telegraph; accessed January 18, 2016.

1917 births
2012 deaths
American people of Austrian descent
Female models from Connecticut
American film actresses
Actresses from Hartford, Connecticut
Traphagen School of Fashion alumni
20th-century American actresses
21st-century American women